Lance Cove, Newfoundland and Labrador is a local service district and designated place in the Canadian province of Newfoundland and Labrador.

Lance Cove is a village on Bell Island that is located south of Wabana and east of Bickfordville. The Way Office was established in 1888 and the first Way Master was William Clements.

Geography 
Lance Cove, Bell Island is in Newfoundland within Subdivision R of Division No. 1.

Demographics 

Government 
Lance Cove, Bell Island is a local service district (LSD) that is governed by a committee responsible for the provision of certain services to the community. The chair of the LSD committee is Sharon Hammond.

See also 
 Bell Island (Newfoundland and Labrador)
 List of designated places in Newfoundland and Labrador
 List of local service districts in Newfoundland and Labrador
 Newfoundland outport
 Wabana, Newfoundland and Labrador

References 

Designated places in Newfoundland and Labrador
Local service districts in Newfoundland and Labrador